P. bicolor  may refer to:
 Phyllobates bicolor, the black-legged dart frog, a frog species found in the Chocó area in western Colombia
 Phyllomedusa bicolor, a giant leaf frog species found throughout the Amazon Rainforest

See also
 Bi-color (disambiguation)